Lake Valley is a 60-mile (97 km) long valley in northeast Lincoln County, Nevada. The North Lake Valley is an endorheic basin; South Lake Valley contains Patterson Wash, a northwest headwater tributary to the Meadow Valley Wash; the northeast headwater section of Meadow Valley Wash is a shorter drainage coming from the south of the Wilson Creek Range, the northeast border of South Lake Valley.

The water divide between the North & South sub-valleys is about halfway between both sections. Squaw Knoll is on the east crest of the water divide; the valley's water divide is part of the Great Basin Divide of southeast Nevada.

About  of the North Lake Valley extends into south White Pine County.

Description

Squaw Knoll and Pony Springs, Nevada
Pony Springs, Nevada is adjacent the water divide which separates the North and South Lake Valleys. The town is located on U.S. 93 which traverses the entire mountain foothills of the valley's western perimeter. The highway leaves South Lake Valley at Pioche in the mountains, then turns due south. Route 93 travels north beyond North Lake Valley to meet U.S. Route 50 in Nevada, about  further.

North Lake Valley, endorheic
The North Valley is due north-south trending, and bordered on the east by the short, and narrow, north-south Fortification Range, which lies at the extreme southeast of the extensive north-south Spring Valley.

South Lake Valley
Patterson Wash drains south, and then southeast along the west of the valley's center. It originates at the north-south water divide, and its origin lies due east of the Fairview Range, the small range on the center-west water divide perimeter. Patterson Wash then drains due southeast along the northeast of the Bristol Range, past Pioche and intercepts Meadow Valley Wash  further.

References

External links
Squaw Knoll: Trails Near Squaw Knoll, Lincoln County, (coordinates)
Lake Valley: Lawmakers seek Lincoln County, "solar development zones"

Valleys of Lincoln County, Nevada
Valleys of White Pine County, Nevada
Valleys of Nevada